Fastrac may refer to

 JCB Fastrac, a tractor by J. C. Bamford
 Fastrac rocket engine, NASA's (cancelled) project
 Fastrac (software), VTLS software
 Formation Autonomy Spacecraft with Thrust, Relnav, Attitude, and Crosslink, A University of Texas satellite

See also
 Fast Track (disambiguation)
 Fastrack (disambiguation)